Pseudeboda gambiae is a species of moth of the family Tortricidae. It is found in Gambia.

References

Moths described in 1964
Tortricini
Moths of Africa
Taxa named by Józef Razowski